Santander, officially the Municipality of Santander,  is a 4th class municipality in the province of Cebu, Philippines. According to the 2020 census, it has a population of 18,527 people.

It serves as one of the sea ports connecting to the province of Negros Oriental with its passenger ferries making way to Sibulan in just 20 minutes.

Santander is bordered to the north by the towns of Oslob and Samboan, to the west is Tañon Strait, to the east is the Cebu Strait, and to the south is the province of Negros Oriental in Negros Island.

Roll-on roll-off (roro) barges of the Maayo Shipping Lines also carry motorcycles, cars, buses, and trucks between the ports of Liloan (in Santander) and Sibulan (in Negros Oriental) with trips taking about 30 minutes, and between Liloan and Larena (in Siquijor) in about 1 hour and 30 minutes.

History

Santander used to be under the Kingdom of Sialo, under the Rajahnate of Cebu.

Santander was originally called Tañong, but as the Spaniards came, it was renamed Santander after a city on the northern (Atlantic) coast of Spain.

The town was established in 1867 and the parish in 1897, It became a municipality during the American occupation in 1918.

Santander is known for its annual Tostado Festival celebrated on the third Sunday of April. Street dancers from different districts dance to moves inspired by the making of tostados.

Geography

Santander's terrain is dominated by a backdrop of rugged ranges which raise from a flat narrow coastal plain. Strongly sloping to sleepy sloping contours are scattered throughout the municipality.

Barangays

Santander comprises 10 barangays (districts):

Climate

The climate of Santander is classified as Af ('Tropical monsoon'). All 12 months have an average precipitation of at least  rainfall per month. Based on temperature, the warmest months of the year are March through October; the winter monsoon brings cooler air from November to February. May is the warmest month, and January, the coolest.

Demographics

The death rate is 3.06 per 1000 people, or 0.306%.

Language

Most of the Tañonganons (people living in Santander) speak Cebuano. In schools, Tagalog and English languages are taught and used as a major instruction in all subjects.

Economy

Santander is the smallest town in Cebu. The majority of the people depend on the sea for livelihood – fishermen who continually explore the vast Palawan and East Philippine seas in search for rich fishing grounds. The method of fishing used is the destructive muro-ami technique, which has been banned on several occasions due to its negative effects on marine life.

In the 1990s, there were four wholesale enterprises, one superstore and few Sari-sari stores. There was also an improvised market composed mostly of talipapas (fish markets). These were located along Jose Rizal Street beside the Municipal building. By the year 2001, the business establishments began to grow and develop. Many larger businesses have been established in Santander such as LGC Marketing.
The major agricultural produce in Santander is corn, copra, and root crops (cassava and sweet potato). Most people, particularly those living in mountain barangays, plant corn as a source of income.

Santander's municipal income classification is fourth class.

Transportation

Several buses and vans-for-hire travel to and from Santander at 20-minute intervals. The ride from Cebu South Bus Terminal in Cebu City is three to four hours.

A wharf in Barangay Talisay takes passengers via fastcrafts or barges to Tampi, San Jose, Negros Oriental. There are also two ports in Barangay Liloan, one for fastcrafts and another for pumpboats to Sibulan, Negros Oriental.

Tourism

Santander's popularity as a tourist destination has increased in the past few years, since it serves as the hub for some world-renowned dive spots like Apo Island, Balicasag, Pescador Island, Sumilon and Siquijor. This is also reflected in the growth of Santander in the tourism industry. Six years ago there were only two resorts, still open today. Today there are eleven.

Sports

Basketball is the most popular sport in Santander. This game is usually played in the afternoons where school time is over and also for the adults whose work hours is done (specially construction works). During summer, a lot of basketball competitions between different barangays. This was done in order that youths avoid vices and illegal drugs.  Volleyball is also played in summer competitions but it is more usually participated in by women. Other sports such as baseball and football are also played in Santander.

Education
There are eight elementary and three high schools in Santander. Two of these schools are private located in Looc. Most of the Tañonganon students are enrolled in public schools especially in Santander Central Elementary School and Santander National School.

References

External links

 [ Philippine Standard Geographic Code]

Municipalities of Cebu
Port cities and towns in the Philippines